The Path of Glory is a 1934 British comedy film directed by Dallas Bower and starring Maurice Evans, Valerie Hobson, Felix Aylmer, Henry Daniell and Athole Stewart. Two European countries plan a war, both hoping to lose it.

A "quota quickie", The Path of Glory is currently missing from the BFI National Archive, and is listed as one of the British Film Institute's "75 Most Wanted" lost films.

Cast
 Maurice Evans as Anton Maroni
 Valerie Hobson as Maria
 Felix Aylmer as President of Thalia
 Henry Daniell as King Maximillian
 Athole Stewart as General Ferranzi
 Stafford Hilliard as Ferraldi
 John Deverell as Paul
 David Burns as Ginsberg
 Frederick Burtwell as Pedro
 Harvey Braban as Colonel Conti

References

See also
BFI 75 Most Wanted, with extensive notes

1934 films
1934 comedy films
British comedy films
British satirical films
Films directed by Dallas Bower
Films set in Europe
Lost British films
British political satire films
Quota quickies
British black-and-white films
1930s English-language films
1930s British films